The Review is a daily local newspaper based in East Liverpool, Ohio and serving the city of East Liverpool, southern Columbiana County, Ohio and northern Hancock County, West Virginia. The paper was founded in 1879 by former Pittsburgh Gazette city editor William McCord as a weekly paper called The Saturday Review, launching on October 29 of that year. In 1885, the paper increased its publication to a daily basis, a frequency the paper maintains to the present. Following this change, the paper was retitled The Evening News Review. In 1904, this was shortened to The Evening Review and by the 1930s, the paper had been retitled as the East Liverpool Review.  Today, the paper is simply called The Review and is owned by Ogden Newspapers, who also owns the nearby newspapers Morning Journal (Lisbon, Ohio), Salem News (Salem, Ohio), The Vindicator (Youngstown, Ohio), Tribune Chronicle (Warren, Ohio), Herald-Star (Steubenville, Ohio), Weirton Daily Times (Weirton, West Virginia), Martins Ferry Times Leader (Martins Ferry, Ohio) and The Intelligencer & Wheeling News Register (Wheeling, West Virginia).

References

External links 
 

Newspapers published in Ohio
Columbiana County, Ohio
Publications established in 1879